Jazztrax, formally known as the Jazztrax Showcase of the Absolute Newest, is a weekly countdown of America's Top 20 Smooth Jazz singles by Art Good.  The show was founded in 1985 by Good in San Diego, and is currently broadcast out of the San Fernando Valley, the heart of smooth jazz. Each week, Art has an interview with a guest performer, while also playing a historic recording from the Jazztrax Archive.  The show is syndicated to 44 different stations around the country, and webcast around the world.  It is typically five hours long.  Jazztrax has also expanded to include the world-famous Catalina Island Jazztrax Festival, the Jazztrax Baseball Train, the Big Bear Lake Jazztrax Summer Festival, and other events, most of which are also simulcast over the web. Also broadcast every Tuesday from 10PM to Wednesday 2AM on Crossover Radio Online

External links
 The Official Jazztrax Homepage - Always Trax with an x

Smooth jazz
American jazz radio programs